Muno is a village of Wallonia and a district of the municipality of Florenville, located in the province of Luxembourg, Belgium.

A 6-km-long section of the former (line 163A) railway between Muno and Sainte-Cécile, dismantled in 1972, has been converted into a bicycle trail.

Geography
The village is limited on its south-western side by the border with France.

References

External links
Official web site 

Florenville
Former municipalities of Luxembourg (Belgium)